RVO may refer to:
 Royal Victorian Order, a dynastic order of knighthood and a house order of chivalry in the Commonwealth realms
 Reciprocal velocity obstacle, a type of velocity obstacle
 Return value optimization, a C++-specific compiler optimization technique.
 Rvo, a village and municipality in the Lankaran Rayon of Azerbaijan.